The Journal of International Commercial Law and Technology is a peer-reviewed open access academic journal covering international commercial law and technology. It is published by the International Association of IT Lawyers. The editor-in-chief is Sylvia Kierkegaard. The journal is abstracted and indexed in Scopus, Academic OneFile, HeinOnline, and EBSCOHost.

External links 
 

Open access journals
International law journals
Publications established in 2006
Academic journals published by learned and professional societies
English-language journals